Holdens railway station was located on the Grange line in the western Adelaide suburb of Woodville. It was located 7.8 kilometres from Adelaide station. Its position was adjacent to the SA Manufacturing Park, which was previously owned by Holden.

History
The station was opened in 1928 along the sidings at Holden's Woodville factory so that cars could be dispatched by rail to interstate destinations. This was also to provide commuter transport for workers after the 1920s and 1930s saw significant development of heavy industry in Woodville and the neighbouring areas. It closed in 1992 and was subsequently demolished following the decline of the heavy industry in the region and the consequent loss of commuters.

Disused railway stations in South Australia
Railway stations in Australia opened in 1928
Railway stations closed in 1992
1992 disestablishments in Australia